The Dragon Tattoo Stories film series, consists of US-American films based on the Millennium novels which were written by Stieg Larsson and David Lagercrantz. The plot centers around Lisbeth Salander, an asocial computer hacker and Mikael Blomkvist, an investigative journalist and publisher of a magazine called Millennium as they investigate criminal injustices.

The Girl with the Dragon Tattoo, an adaption of the first novel in the series, was released in 2011. It was written by Steven Zaillian, directed by David Fincher with Daniel Craig as Mikael Blomkvist and Rooney Mara as Lisbeth Salander. Along with Dragon Tattoo, Fincher and Zaillian signed a two-picture deal to adapt The Girl Who Played with Fire, and The Girl Who Kicked the Hornets' Nest. The Girl in the Spider's Web, an adaption of the first novel in the second trilogy was released in 2018. The film is a quasi-reboot featuring a different cast, but still framed as a sequel to Fincher's film. It is directed by Fede Álvarez, and stars Claire Foy as Salander and Sverrir Gudnason as Blomkvist.

Films

The Girl with the Dragon Tattoo (2011)

A disgraced journalist, Mikael Blomkvist (Daniel Craig) investigates the disappearance of a wealthy patriarch's niece who has been missing for forty years. He is aided by the young computer hacker named Lisbeth Salander (Rooney Mara). As they work together in the investigation, Blomkvist and Salander uncover immense corruption beyond anything anyone could have anticipated.

The Girl in the Spider's Web (2018)

Lisbeth Salander (Claire Foy) and Mikael Blomkvist (Sverrir Gudnason) once again teamup, this time to become involved in a conspiracy of spies, cybercriminals, and corrupt government officials, and discover the deception runs closer than they understand, with familiar ties to the pair.

Development

The Girl with the Dragon Tattoo
The success of Stieg Larsson's novel created Hollywood interest in adapting the book, as became apparent in 2009, when Lynton and Pascal pursued the idea of developing an "American" version unrelated to the Swedish film adaptation released that year. By December, two major developments occurred for the project: Steven Zaillian became the screenwriter, while producer Scott Rudin finalized a partnership allocating full copyrights to Sony. Zaillian, who was unfamiliar with the novel, got a copy from Rudin. The screenwriter recalled, "They sent it to me and said, 'We want to do this.  We will think of it as one thing for now. It's possible that it can be two and three, but let's concentrate on this one.'"

Fincher, who was requested with partner Cean Chaffin by Sony executives to read the novel,
was astounded by the series' size and success. Fincher stated: "The ballistic, ripping-yarn thriller aspect of it is kind of a red herring in a weird way. It is the thing that throws Salander and Blomkvist together, but it is their relationship you keep coming back to. I was just wondering what 350 pages Zaillian would get rid of." Because Zaillian was already cultivating the screenplay, the director avoided interfering. Once the script was completed Fincher was comfortable that "they were headed in the same direction". The writing process lasted approximately six months, including three months reviewing the script, creating notes and analyzing the novel. Given the book's sizable length, Zaillian deleted elements to match Fincher's desired running time. Even so, Zaillan took significant departures from the book. Zaillian stated that during the writing process, the production team intended to stay close to the source material though there would be differences. The production team decided early in the development process that they would not stray away from the novel's darker themes, planning instead to delve deeper into them. Instead of the typical three-act structure, they chose a five-act structure, with Fincher comparing the plot to "a lot of TV cop dramas."

Yellow Bird and Metro-Goldwyn-Mayer partnered with Columbia Pictures to produce the film with Daniel Craig as Mikael Blomkvist and Rooney Mara as Lisbeth Salander.

Canceled sequels 
Along with The Girl with the Dragon Tattoo, Fincher and Zaillian signed a two-picture deal to adapt The Girl Who Played with Fire, and The Girl Who Kicked the Hornets' Nest, which would possibly have been shot back to back. In January 2012, it was announced that Sony was "moving forward" with the adaptations of The Girl Who Played with Fire and The Girl Who Kicked the Hornet's Nest. Zaillian wrote the original screenplays, but Sony brought in Andrew Kevin Walker to revise them. The studio had hoped to have the same people involved in the sequels as in the first film, with Fincher directing and Daniel Craig and Rooney Mara starring, but due to delays, the projects fell through.

The Girl in the Spider's Web
In November 2015, The Hollywood Reporter announced that Sony Pictures Entertainment was planning to develop a new film series based on the Millennium novels, starting with an adaptation of The Girl in the Spider's Web by David Lagercrantz. In the same announcement, it was confirmed that Rooney Mara and Daniel Craig, nor Fincher would return to the series. Steven Knight was announced in early negotiations to develop the adaptation, while the producers would be Scott Rudin, Amy Pascal, Elizabeth Cantillon, Berna Levin, Søren Stærmose, and Ole Sondberg.

By November 2016, Sony had entered negotiations with Fede Álvarez to direct the film, with Eli Bush slated to act as an additional producer. In March 2017, it was announced that the film would feature an entirely new cast as the director wanted to be able to create his own interpretation of the source material. Production set to begin in September 2017. In September 2017, Foy was officially cast in the starring role. By October, Sylvia Hoeks joined the cast as Camilla Salander. The rest of the cast was announced over the next five months.

Principal photography began in January 2018 in Berlin, and ended in April 2018, in Stockholm. The film is a quasi-reboot featuring a different cast, but still framed as a sequel to Fincher's film. It is directed by Fede Álvarez, and stars Claire Foy as Salander and Sverrir Gudnason as Blomkvist.

Main cast and characters

Additional crew and production details

Reception

Box office and financial performance

Critical and public response

References

Film series introduced in 2011
Sony Pictures franchises
Columbia Pictures franchises
Metro-Goldwyn-Mayer franchises